Jaimee Monae Foxworth (born December 17, 1979) is an American actress, model, and former pornographic actress. She is best known for her role of Judy Winslow, the youngest daughter of Carl and Harriette Winslow on the ABC sitcom Family Matters, during the show's first four seasons.

Career
Foxworth, who began modeling at the age of five, soon appeared in national television advertisements, and ultimately landed the role of Judy Winslow, the youngest of the Winslow family's three children, on the long-running sitcom Family Matters. After the introduction of Steve Urkel (Jaleel White), Foxworth's scenes on the show were reduced significantly. The combination of the character having little to do on the show and budget cuts caused producers to eliminate her from the series after its fourth season. The character disappeared without explanation, with the Winslows acknowledging only two children: Eddie (Darius McCrary) and Laura (Kellie Shanygne Williams). Jo Marie Payton, who played matriarch Hariette Winslow, was particularly upset with Foxworth's dismissal, stating that producers had decided "nobody would notice" Judy was gone. 

With very little acting work coming in the years after Family Matters, Foxworth formed an R&B musical group, S.H.E., with her two sisters (Tyren Perry and Jania Perry). They released their debut album 3's a Charm on July 1, 1997, through Shaquille O'Neal's T.W.IsM./Interscope Records. From 2000-2002, she worked in the adult industry, making pornographic films under the pseudonym Crave.

Personal life 
Foxworth battled substance abuse and depression. It was rumored that this was prompted in part by a judge's ruling that her trust fund of more than $500,000 be used to save her family from bankruptcy, but she denied this in a 2009 interview, stating, "I think [that came] from the National Enquirer. We never filed for bankruptcy. We were almost to the point where we were just completely flat broke but we never filed for bankruptcy."

In December 2008, People magazine reported that Foxworth was pregnant. According to the report, she and longtime boyfriend Michael Shaw were expecting a child in early 2009. On May 29, 2009, People reported that Foxworth and Shaw's baby, a boy named Michael Douglas Shaw, Jr., had been born. He was 10 days overdue, and Foxworth shared the news of his birth while still in the delivery room via text message.

In Fall 2009, the TV One series Life After chronicled Foxworth's story, dealing with her departure from Family Matters, and her subsequent use of marijuana, which she claimed to have stopped smoking. Also, during the show, her newborn son was shown.

Filmography 
 Family Matters (1989–1993) TV Series

Notable TV guest appearances 
 Celebrity Rehab with Dr. Drew
 The Tyra Banks Show October 6, 2006
 The Oprah Winfrey Show January 29, 2006
 20/20 April 29, 2005
 TV 101 playing Whitney Hines in episode: "Home" (episode #1.4) December 20, 1988
 Amen playing Choir in episode: "Your Christmas Show of Shows" (episode #1.11) December 20, 1986 Syress - 2018

References

External links 
 
 

1979 births
Living people
African-American actresses
Participants in American reality television series
People from Belleville, Illinois
Actresses from Illinois
20th-century American actresses
African-American female models
American female models
African-American models
American child models
American television actresses
American child actresses
Female models from Illinois
20th-century African-American women
20th-century African-American people
21st-century African-American people
21st-century African-American women